Sach Khand (Gurmukhi: ਸਚਖੰਡ) is a term used in Sikhism to denote an individual's union with God.

Guru Nanak, the founder of Sikhism, described a hierarchy of five spiritual levels in the Japji Sahib. The highest level in this hierarchy is known as the Sach Khand where the individual attains a mystical union with God. Before reaching the level of Sach Khand, the individual must ascend progressively through four lower levels—starting from Dharam Khand, and progressing through Gian Khand, Saram Khand, and Karam Khand.

Many Sikhs conceptualize Sach Khand not as a mystical state transcending death, but as a "heavenly abode"—a place where one's spirit goes after death.

References 

Sikh philosophical concepts